This is a list of books in the Sweet Valley High series, created by Francine Pascal.  There are 181 books in total.

Books

Super Editions

Super Thrillers

Super Stars

Magna Editions

References

Books
Lists of books